Flying Officer MP Anil Kumar (5 May 1964 – 20 May 2014) was a MiG 21 pilot in the Indian Air Force; after he became a quadriplegic as a result of a motor-cycle accident, he became a writer and historian. After the accident in 1988 he lived in the Paraplegic Rehabilitation Centre of Pune, where on 20 May 2014 he died.

Kumar learned to write with a pen held in his mouth. An essay he wrote, titled "Airborne to Chairborne", was widely read, and was included in some school textbooks in Maharashtra and Kerala.

Early life and education
M.P. Anil Kumar was born in Chirayinkeezhu, 35 km north of Thiruvananthapuram, Kerala. At the age of 9, he entered Sainik School, Kazhakootam. Later he was found worthy to be admitted to the 65th course at National Defence Academy and as the best in acrobatics at the passing out parade of 134 pilots course at the Air force.
Among the military heroes of independent India, Flight Lieutenant M.P. Anil Kumar aka ‘MP’ stands out. His heroism was neither in a battlefield nor was it flying MiG-21 fighters that he mastered as an Air Force officer. MP's bravery, now celebrated in a book, was as a quadriplegic. Hardly able to move his head, he spent almost half of his 50 years in a wheelchair. MP's accident did not have anything to do with war or regular duty. Simply put, he is an example that even a quadriplegic if given a chance to live in a healthy peaceful environment, can be a great inspiration.

MP attributed everything he was able to do in life to his Sainik School education and training at the National Defence Academy. In many ways, he exemplified what soldiers can achieve in peace. Modern history is replete with narratives of how nations that do not make enough efforts at peace, so that their soldiers can enjoy a normal lifespan to showcase their unique skills and abilities, will be reduced to chest-thumping jingoists in a land awash with forgotten war widows.

Accident
On 28 June 1988, MP was winding up a usual day at his fighter base in Pathankot after flying a couple of sorties as a wingman to senior pilots. Night flying had just been called off because of thundershowers, and MP, then just 24, was returning to the officers’ mess when he met with a freak bike accident. "In one quirky instant 20 years ago, a mishap reduced me to a wreck of a combat pilot. From the fighter cockpit to a wheelchair, from a bird’s eye view to a worm’s eye view of the world... Life was never the same," he wrote a few years ago.

It was his personal battle against tragedy, almost entirely from the Army's Paraplegic Rehabilitation Centre in Pune until he died on 20 May 2014, that makes MP a truly inspirational figure. With a pencil in his mouth, he taught himself to tap letter by letter, every comma and full stop in place, on to a keyboard that was placed in front of him. The specially created workstation helped MP write some of the most powerful and original commentaries on military issues in India for various publications. Many of his readers, enthralled by the lyrical prose and precise numbers, never even figured out that all of it was written from memory and without references.

What really connected MP to the thousands of his admirers were his personal narratives of his own struggle after the accident. He mouth-wrote "Airborne to Chairborne", an iconic 1994 essay about his accident and how he fought his way back into life, which is now part of textbooks in a few State syllabuses. There is hardly a better piece of writing in modern India that captures what determination can achieve. "Greater the difficulty sweeter the victory," MP signed off that piece.

Writings and life as a quadriplegic
Ever since his article emerged in public, hundreds of children dropped in at his Pune home to talk to MP, and thousands more were inspired by him. From his wheelchair, MP counselled many into new careers, to find fresh meaning in life, and to embrace challenges with indomitable human spirit. MP didn't need any academic examples to illustrate his arguments.

In many ways, Born to Fly, MP's biography by his course-mate Air Commodore Nitin Sathe, which was released on 25 October, holds a mirror to the urban elite of India who are yet again in a jingoistic mood. From TV channels to print media, from political platforms to NGO meets, warmongering is the loudest noise emanating. There are jarring whispers of gratitude for soldiers about some imminent martyrdom in the air. War is being sought with such passion that human progress seems like a focussed march into bloody battlefields. As if soldiers are born to die, mere commodities and symbols to prove the dishonest and ill-informed patriotism of the loud- and foul-mouthed.

Illness and death
Anil Kumar died on 20 May 2014, two weeks after he turned 50. He had  blood cancer; he was diagnosed only shortly before his 50th birthday. His mortal remains were cremated at Bopodi Gas Shavadahini in Pune.

Biography
A biography of MP Anil Kumar, titled Born to Fly, was published  on 25 October 2016. It was written by Air Commodore Nitin Sathe. Socrates K. Valath, noted Malayalam writer and filmmaker has made a documentary on the life of Anil Kumar, titled, And the Fight Goes On.

References

External links 
 
 

Indian Air Force officers
Indian people with disabilities
1964 births
2014 deaths
Sainik School alumni